This is a chronological list of Australian films by decade and year for years 1980s. For a complete alphabetical list, see :Category:Australian films.
A list of films produced in Australia by year during the 1980s, in the List of Australian films.

1980
 List of Australian films of 1980

1981
 List of Australian films of 1981

1982
 List of Australian films of 1982

1983
 List of Australian films of 1983

1984
 List of Australian films of 1984

1985
 List of Australian films of 1985

1986
 List of Australian films of 1986

1987
 List of Australian films of 1987

1988
 List of Australian films of 1988

1989
 List of Australian films of 1989

External links
 Australian film at the Internet Movie Database

Australian
Films